House in Provence (French title: Maison devant la Sainte-Victoire près de Gardanne) is an oil painting by French artist Paul Cézanne. Created between 1886 and 1890,  it is part of the permanent collection in the Indianapolis Museum of Art.

Description
With muted tones and soft colors, Cézanne painted a home, accented by the gray-blue mountains in the background, the soft greens of the rolling hills, and the brown tones of the fields. Cézanne's dynamic style is best observed closely in this painting; the brushstrokes intersect in dynamic way, creating a patchwork. The brushstrokes create lively movement within the hard lines that he creates to border the house and the mountain.

Historical information
House in Provence comes out of Cézanne's 'mature style', where he lived in Provence with his family, where Cézanne lived as a youth. This landscape is set on the South side of Montagne Sainte-Victoire, which was a favorite subject of the artist.  Cézanne did not share the same interests as the rest of the impressionists, instead focusing his work on the basic structure of his subjects. Here are the horizontal bands of grey-blue, green, and brown, contrasting with the vertical trees and the solidly-built isolated farmhouse.

Provenance
House in Provence was probably bought by the artist Ambroise Vollard. In 1910, it was sold to Henri Bernstein. It was likely sold to Gottlieb Reber in 1918. It was sold to Marie Harriman by 1936. In 1945, the piece was purchased by Caroline Marmon Fesler for the John Herron Art Institute, now the Indianapolis Museum of Art, in memory of her parents, Daniel W. and Elizabeth C. Marmon.

See also
List of paintings by Paul Cézanne

References

Paintings by Paul Cézanne
1885 paintings
Paintings in the collection of the Indianapolis Museum of Art